Kerala Rail Development Corporation d/b/a Kerala-Rail (stylized as Kerala-rail) is a public sector joint venture company under the ownership of the Government of Kerala  for the railway infrastructure development in Kerala. The company was incorporated on 3 January 2017.

The K-Rail is focused on the planning and implementation of rail line projects including surveys and preparation of Detailed Project Reports (DPR). Kerala rail is also involved in procuring requisite approvals and does processing for the sanctioning of identified Projects.

Proposed projects

Thiruvananthapuram–Kasargode Semi High Speed Rail Corridor

The Thiruvananthapuram–Kasargode Semi High Speed Rail Corridor named Silver Line is a proposed high-speed rail corridor in India that would connect the capital city of Kerala, Thiruvananthapuram with Kasaragod in Kerala.

Rolling stock:

EMU type train set of 9 cars which is extendable to 12-15 cars in the future

Passenger capacity: 625 passengers (9 car set)

Seating:  2+2 seating (Business class), 3+2 seating (Standard class)

Signalling & communication:

ETCS Level 2 with LTE

Power supply & traction:

From KSEBL through Solar & other Renewable Energy

Proposed fare: Rs. 2.75 per km in Standard Class.

Estimated project completion cost: Rs 63940.67 Crores

Structure of route length:

Thalassery – Mysore New Broad-Gauge Line
The proposed project is a broad gauge railway line interconnection between Thalassery of central Malabar region of Kerala and Mysore, the cultural capital of Karnataka.

Nilambur – Nanjangud Railway Line

The Nilambur–Nanjangud railway line also called The Golden I T Corridor or Wayanad Railway is a proposed project to establish faster interconnectivity between the two states of Kerala and Karnataka through the construction of a direct short distance broad gauge line  between Nilambur in the Malappuram district of Kerala and Nanjangud in Chamaraja Nagar district of Karnataka. The first proposal for such a line dates back to 1881.

Coaching terminal complex

Kerala Rail Development Corporation Limited (KRDCL) has submitted a feasibility report to Southern Railway for the redevelopment of the marshalling yard at Ponnuruni to construct an international standard coaching terminal complex. The underutilized land here in Ponnurunni, at the heart of the city, will have the capacity to host trains, apart from having space for repair and maintenance of trains. The new terminal would become a new halt station for trains through Kottayam and will also be a terminal point for new trains that are allotted to the state. The Southern Railway has entrusted the Kerala Rail Development Corporation Ltd for preparing a feasibility report on the terminal in October 2020.
The proposed terminal will also ease the long-standing traffic congestion in Kochi and accelerate the development of the railways in the state. The feasibility study says the project is technically feasible and financially viable and recommended for implementation to have higher mobility, meet the traffic growth and economic development of the State.  The project can be completed over three years. The feasibility report suggests a station complex with 4 platforms, 1 pit line, 2 parcel lines, 2 stabling lines, wagon examination line in addition to retaining the existing coaching depot. The expected total investment through the project is Rs 1654 crore including the development of the railway infrastructure for Rs 325 crore. The plan is in such a way that the number of passenger platforms can be increased depending on the increasing traffic demand in the future.

Sabari railway line

Sabarimala Railway is a proposed  railway line from Angamaly to Erumeli, (and possible extension until punalur) near Sabarimala that had been sanctioned in the year 1998 by Indian Railways. According to a Memorandum of Understanding (MoU) signed between the Kerala State and the Ministry of Railways on 27 January 2016, commercially viable railway projects will be identified and handed over to the Special Purpose Vehicle (SPV) to be fast-tracked on a 51:49 per cent equity basis. SPV has discussed about the extension to Punalur. Kerala Rail Development corporation shows interest for constructing this new sabarimala railway line

See also

Kerala Rapid Transit Corporation Ltd.
Kochi Metro Rail Limited

References

Transport in Kerala
Companies based in Kerala
2017 establishments in Kerala
Railway companies of India
Transport companies established in 2017
History of Kerala (1947–present)
Proposed railway lines in India